Marianne Adelaide Hedwig Dohm (née Schlesinger, later Schleh; 20 September 1831 – 1 June 1919) was a German feminist and author.

Family

She was born in the Prussian capital Berlin to assimilated Jewish parents, and her father was baptized. The third child of (Henriette) Wilhelmine Jülich, née Beru and tobacco manufacturer Gustav Adolph Gotthold Schlesinger (originally Elchanan Cohen Schlesinger). Her father had converted to Protestantism in 1817; in 1851 he adopted the surname Schleh. Hedwig's parents did not marry until 1838, as her father's family had strong reservations about this marital union.

While her brothers were enabled to attend the Gymnasium, Hedwig had to leave school at the age of 15, to help out with household chores. Three years later, she began an apprenticeship at a teaching seminary.

In 1853 she became the wife of writer and actor Ernst Dohm (Elias Levy; 1819–1883), editor-in-chief of the Kladderadatsch satirical magazine, with whom she had five children:
 Hans Ernst (1854–1866), the only son 
 Gertrude Hedwig Anna (1855–1942), married the mathematician Alfred Pringsheim (1850–1941)
 Ida Marie Elisabeth "Else" (1856–1922)
 Marie Pauline Adelheid (1858–?) 
 Eva (1859–?)
By her daughter Gertrude Hedwig, she became grandmother of Katharina "Katia" Pringsheim (1883–1980), the wife of Thomas Mann, and of the musician Klaus Pringsheim Sr. (1883–1972). By another daughter, Marie Pauline Adelheid, she became grandmother of Hedda Korsch, a communist activist and educationalist who married Karl Korsch.

Life
Hedwig and her husband associated with the intellectual circles in Berlin, the future German capital. In 1867 she published her first study, on the historical development of Spanish national literature, based on the knowledge she had taught herself on an autodidactic basis. From the early 1870s onwards, she published feminist treatises demanding legal, social and economic equality, as well as women's suffrage. These essays encountered opposition by feminists who concentrated on better educational opportunities for young women. In the late 1870s, Hedwig wrote several theatre comedies that were all performed at the Berlin Schauspielhaus.

After her husband died in 1883, she began to write novels, until from the late 1880s she again published numerous treatises on the revived feminist movement. Hedwig Dohm also founded the Reform association advocating a comprehensive educational reform and female university studies. She joined the Frauenwohl ("Women's Welfare") association founded by Minna Cauer as well as Helene Stöcker's League for the Protection of Mothers (Bund für Mutterschutz).

Hedwig Dohm publicly spoke out against the patriotic fever on the eve of World War I, publishing pacifist articles in the communist journal Die Aktion edited by Franz Pfemfert.

Hedwig Dohm died in Berlin at the age of 87. She is buried in the Alter St.-Matthäus-Kirchhof in the Schöneberg district.

Literary works 
 Was die Pastoren von den Frauen denken, 1872
 Der Jesuitismus im Hausstande, 1873
 Die wissenschaftliche Emanzipation der Frau, 1874
 Der Frauen Natur und Recht, 1876
 Die Antifeministen. Ein Buch der Verteidigung, 1902
 Die Mütter. Ein Beitrag zur Erziehungsfrage, 1903
 Der Mißbrauch des Todes, 1915

Literature 
 Werde die du bist. Wie Frauen werden, 2 novels 1894
 Sibilla Dalmar, 1896
 Schicksale einer Seele, 1899
 Christa Ruland, 1902

References

Further reading 
 Nikola Müller und Isabel Rohner (Hg.): Hedwig Dohm  – Ausgewählte Texte. Berlin: trafo Verlag, 2006.

External links

 
 
 Eine Homepage rund um Hedwig Dohm
 Dohms Werke beim Projekt Gutenberg
 Biografie in der Berlinischen Monatsschrift 
 Satirische Auseinandersetzung mit Georg Groddecks These, dass Frauen keine Persönlichkeit hätten
 GHDI – Document at germanhistorydocs.ghi-dc.org Hedwig Dohm's Essay "What the Pastors Think of Women" (1872)
 GHDI – Document at germanhistorydocs.ghi-dc.org Hedwig Dohm's Essay, "Women's Right to Vote" (1876)

1831 births
1919 deaths
Writers from Berlin
19th-century German people
German feminists
Jewish feminists
German pacifists
Pacifist feminists
Jewish German writers
People from the Province of Brandenburg
19th-century German women writers
20th-century German women writers